Euceros is a worldwide genus of ichneumon wasps in the family Ichneumonidae. It is the sole genus of the subfamily Eucerotinae.
 
Euceros species are hyperparasitoids of Ichneumonoidea. First instar larvae hatch from eggs laid on leaf surfaces, attach to passing Lepidoptera or Symphyta larva and enter the body of an emerging primary endoparasitoid, such as a campoplegine or banchine or an attached ectoparasitoid.  The genus has been variously placed in Tryphoninae and Ctenopelmatinae.

Species
These 48 species belong to the genus Euceros:

 Euceros albibasalis Uchida, 1932 c g
 Euceros albitarsus Curtis, 1837 c g
 Euceros albomarginatus Cushman, 1922 c g
 Euceros annulicornis Barron, 1978 c g
 Euceros arcuatus Barron, 1976 c g
 Euceros canadensis Cresson, 1869 c g
 Euceros chinensis Kasparyan, 1984 c g
 Euceros clypealis Barron, 1978 c g
 Euceros congregatus Barron, 1976 c g
 Euceros coxalis Barron, 1978 c g
 Euceros croceus Barron, 1978 c g
 Euceros decorus Walley, 1932 c g
 Euceros dentatus Barron, 1978 c g
 Euceros digitalis Walley, 1932 c g
 Euceros enargiae Barron, 1976 c g
 Euceros faciens Davis, 1897 c g
 Euceros flavescens Cresson, 1869 c g
 Euceros frigidus Cresson, 1869 c g
 Euceros gilvus Barron, 1978 c g
 Euceros incisurae Barron, 1978 c g
 Euceros latitarsus Barron, 1978 c g
 Euceros limatus Barron, 1978 c g
 Euceros maculicornis Barron, 1978 c g
 Euceros madecassus Seyrig, 1934 c g
 Euceros medialis Cresson, 1869 c g
 Euceros melanosoma Barron, 1976 c g
 Euceros melleus Barron, 1978 c g
 Euceros obesus Davis, 1897 c g
 Euceros obliquus Barron, 1976 c g
 Euceros pectinis Barron, 1978 c g
 Euceros pinguipes Barron, 1976 c g
 Euceros pruinosus (Gravenhorst, 1829) c g
 Euceros ribesii Barron, 1976 c g
 Euceros ruber Barron, 1976 c g
 Euceros ruficeps Barron, 1978 c g
 Euceros rufocinctus (Ashmead, 1906) c g
 Euceros sachalinensis Kasparyan, 1992 c g
 Euceros sanguineus Davis, 1897 c g
 Euceros schizophrenus Kasparyan, 1984 c g
 Euceros semiothisae Barron, 1976 c g
 Euceros sensibus Uchida, 1930 c g
 Euceros serricornis (Haliday, 1838) c g
 Euceros signicornis Barron, 1978 c g
 Euceros superbus Kriechbaumer, 1888 c g
 Euceros taiwanus Kasparyan, 1992 c g
 Euceros thoracicus Cresson, 1869 c g
 Euceros tunetanus (Schmiedeknecht, 1900) c g
 Euceros unispina Kasparyan, 1984 c g

Data sources: i = ITIS, c = Catalogue of Life, g = GBIF, b = Bugguide.net

References

Barron, J.R. 1976. Systematics of Nearctic Euceros (Hymenoptera: Ichneumonidae: Eucerotinae). Naturaliste Canadien 103:285‑375.
Barron, J.R. 1978. Systematics of the world Eucerotinae (Hymenoptera, Ichneumonidae), Part 2. Non‑Nearctic species. Naturaliste Canadien l05: 327–24.

Further reading

External links

  Waspweb
 

Parasitic wasps
Hyperparasites